Globimetula is a genus of flowering plants belonging to the family Loranthaceae.

Its native range is Tropical Africa.

Species:

Globimetula anguliflora 
Globimetula assiana 
Globimetula braunii 
Globimetula cornutibracteata 
Globimetula cupulata 
Globimetula dinklagei 
Globimetula elegantiflora 
Globimetula kivuensis 
Globimetula mayombensis 
Globimetula mweroensis 
Globimetula oreophila 
Globimetula pachyclada 
Globimetula rubripes

References

Loranthaceae
Loranthaceae genera